Rise: Ini Kalilah is a 2018 Malaysian Malay-language political drama film co-directed by Saw Teong Hin, Nik Amir Mustapha and MS Prem Nath, produced by WebTV Asia. The film was starring Remy Ishak, Mira Filzah, Sangeeta Krishnasamy, Jack Tan, Shashi Tharan and Jenn Chia as well as other ensemble cast. Based on an actual events during the 14th General Election on May 9, 2018, the film was released on 13 September 2018.

Synopsis
The storyline tracks six intertwined personal stories and struggles leading up to the 14th historic general election in Malaysia on 9 May 2018.

Plot summary
June is a fixer working with Australian journalist Marcus to cover the 2018 Malaysian general election. The two investigate instances of opposition Pakatan Harapan posters being vandalised and vote tampering. Elsewhere, Fizah is a Malay university student studying in the United Kingdom while working part-time as a restaurant waiter. After ending up in an election campaign video, Fizah is convinced by a classmate to return to Malaysia. Meanwhile, Corporal Azman is a police officer who grows disillusioned with the corruption of the ruling Barisan Nasional coalition. While his colleague takes bribes from politicians and businessmen, Azman struggles to balance his moral compass with feeding his family.

Shanti juggles teaching at a Tamil primary school while working as a polling and counting agent. She clashes with her father, a principal who is skeptical of change. Shanti also has a romantic relationship with Leong. Meanwhile in Singapore, Leong is a hot-tempered hawker stall worker who returns to Malaysia in order to vote in the 2018 election. Elsewhere, Selva is a foreign worker agency owner who witnesses the plight and exploitation of Bangladeshi migrant workers.

The six storylines converge on the election day on 9 May. Shanti discovers that election officials are a turning a blind eye to non-citizens posing as voters. Fizah arrives at the polling booth at 5pm but is prevented from casting her vote on the grounds that the deadline for voting has closed. Under pressure from Shanti and June, the election officials allow Fizah and the other voters to cast their vote. The film reaches a climax when someone attempts to flee with stolen ballot boxes in a car. The protagonists are involved in a scuffle with the driver. Azman's colleague attempts to beat the participants but Azman restrains him, choosing the side of the people.

The film ends with stock footage from the 2018 Malaysian election and Mahathir Mohamed addressing the nation. June and Marcus also cover Mahathir's meeting with the Yang di-Pertuan Agong Nazri Shah at Istana Negara.

Cast
 Remy Ishak as Corporal Azman
 Mira Filzah as Fizah
 Jack Tan as Leong
 Sangeeta Krishnasamy as Shanti
 Shashi Tharan as Selva
 Jenn Chia as June
 Mark O'Dea as Marcus

Production
Rise: Ini Kalilah was shot in Malaysia, Singapore and Britain.

Release and reception
Rise: Ini Kalilah received overwhelmingly negative reviews and was a box office bomb. It grossed only RM58,411 after 14 days in the theaters despite a production budget of RM2 million, an ensemble cast and the best effort of the new government to promote it.

On 25 February 2019, international streaming service Netflix acquired the rights to Rise: Ini Kalilah.

See also

 2018 Malaysian general election

References

External links
 Official website

2018 films
2010s political drama films
Canadian political drama films
Malaysian political drama films
National Film Board of Canada documentaries
2010s Canadian films